Irfan Siddiqi is an American physicist and currently a professor of physics at the University of California, Berkeley and a faculty scientist at Lawrence Berkeley National Laboratory (LBNL). He currently is the director of the Quantum Nanoelectronics Laboratory at UC Berkeley and the Advanced Quantum Testbed at LBNL. Siddiqi is known for groundbreaking contributions to the fields of superconducting quantum circuits, including dispersive single-shot readout of superconducting quantum bits, quantum feedback, observation of single quantum trajectories, and near-quantum limited microwave frequency amplification. In addition to other honors, for his pioneering work in superconducting devices, he was awarded with the American Physical Society George E. Valley, Jr. Prize in 2006, "for the development of the Josephson bifurcation amplifier for ultra-sensitive measurements at the quantum limit." Siddiqi is a fellow of the American Physical Society and a recipient of the UC Berkeley Distinguished Teaching Award in 2016.

Biography
Siddiqi was born in Rawalpindi, Pakistan, and is a direct descendant of the well-known leader of the Khilafat Movement, Muslim activist, journalist and poet, Maulana Mohammad Ali Jauhar (Urdu: مَولانا مُحمّد علی جَوہر) Siddiqi moved to New York City at an early age. He attended the Bronx High School of Science, Bronx, NY, where he developed a strong interest in physics, chemistry, and mathematics. His aptitude in physics and mathematics led him to the Columbia University Science Honors Program. He went on to Harvard University to complete his undergraduate education, earning an A.B. with distinguished honors (cum laude) in Chemistry and Physics in 1997. Inspired by superconductivity and superconducting digital circuits during a summer internship at HYPRES, Inc., he enrolled at Yale University for his doctoral studies. His graduate work focused mainly on aluminum hot-electron bolometers for microwave astronomy. Upon receiving his Ph.D. in 2002, he remained as a postdoctoral fellow at Yale to research high frequency measurement techniques for superconducting qubits.  His post-doctoral work resulted in the development of the Josephson Bifurcation Amplifier, which makes use of the non-dissipative, non-linear nature of the Josephson junction to realize high gain and minimal back action measurements of quantum systems. He joined the University of California, Berkeley as a faculty member in the summer of 2005, and is currently a full professor in the Physics Department. In 2015, his laboratory was awarded the UC Berkeley Award for Excellence in Laboratory Safety, awarded by the Berkeley Office of Environment, Health and Safety.

Siddiqi's research is mainly focused on the fields of quantum electrodynamics and cQED. His current research interests include quantum error correction, multi-partite entanglement generation, quantum simulation of high-correlated condensed matter and high-energy physics theories, and single photon detection.

Siddiqi was one of the five faculty recipients of the "2016 Berkeley Distinguished Teaching Award", which is the University of California, Berkeley's most prestigious honor for teaching. In 2021, Siddiqi was awarded the Joseph F. Keithley Award For Advances in Measurement Science "for fundamental advances in superconducting parametric amplifiers, including the development of the Josephson traveling wave parametric amplifier, and for their application to quantum measurement and control."

As the director of the Advanced Quantum Testbed, Siddiqi and his team are on a mission to develop a digital quantum computer based on superconducting circuits to tackle fundamental science applications relevant to the US Department of Energy. The project aims to collaboratively advance the field by incorporating state-of-the-art quantum hardware into an open-access research tool for the science community.

Siddiqi resides with his family, including two children, in California.

Honors
Joseph F. Keithley Award For Advances in Measurement Science (2021)
Rensselaer Polytechnic Institute Medal
Distinguished Teaching Award, University of California, Berkeley (2016) 
American Physical Society, Division of Condensed Matter Physics, Fellow (2015) 
The DARPA Young Faculty Award (2009) 
The Air Force Office of Scientific Research, Young Investigator Award (2008) 
The UC Berkeley Chancellor's Partnership Faculty Fund (2007) 
The UC Berkeley Hellman Faculty Fund (2007) 
The Office of Naval Research, Young Investigator Award (2007)
The George E. Valley Prize, American Physical Society (2006) 
The Harding Bliss Prize, Yale University (2002) 
The Harvard Foundation for Intercultural and Race Relations Citation (1997) 
Perkins Prize, Lowell House Harvard University (1997)

Notable publications

References

External links
 http://physics.berkeley.edu/people/faculty/irfan-siddiqi
 http://online.kitp.ucsb.edu/online/qcontrol_c13/siddiqi/rm/flash.html
 http://escholarship.org/uc/item/7xp5h2zf

Living people
University of California, Berkeley faculty
Yale Graduate School of Arts and Sciences alumni
Harvard College alumni
21st-century American physicists
American academics of Pakistani descent
Quantum information scientists
Pakistani emigrants to the United States
1976 births
Fellows of the American Physical Society